Nicole Boury-Esnault is a retired French researcher of sponges, formerly at Centre d'Océanologie de Marseille, Aix-Marseille University.

Research 
In 1995, Nicole Boury-Esnault and Jean Vacelet discovered a species of carnivorous sponges of the genus Asbestopluma, during an exploration of a shallow cave in the Mediterranean. Caves can recapitulate the environment of the deep sea-bed due to the darkness and lack of nutrient, permitting the study of deep-sea-like regions in shallow areas of water. Carnivorous sponges, lacking the normal filter feeding apparatus, had been previously discovered during deep-sea trawls and presumed to be damaged since they did not have a known feeding mechanism. The discovery of members of the family in shallow water meant that they could be experimentally tested, which is when Boury-Esnault and Vacelet observed feeding on small crustaceans. Later they also reported on a member of the genus which used both carnivory and methanotrophy to survive in deep-sea expeditions of the Barbados trench.

Boury-Esnault and Vacelet also found hexactinellid (glass) sponges, another deep-sea species, in these shallow cave waters, permitting detailed study for the first time. She led a collaboration with Oceana and the University of Victoria which found new glass sponges in the Mediterranean Sea, and in the Atlantic Ocean. In 1997 Boury-Esnault and Klaus Rutzler published a 'Thesaurus of Sponge Morphology' with the Smithsonian Institution.
In 2012 Boury-Esnault was involved in a study capturing the number and diversity of sponges in seas all around the world.

Publications

Books

See also
Taxa named by Nicole Boury-Esnault

References 

Academic staff of Aix-Marseille University
Women marine biologists
French women biologists
Spongiologists